The Kiribati national badminton team represents Kiribati in international badminton team competitions and is organized by the Kiribati Badminton Federation (Gilbertese: Raorao ni badminton ni Kiribati), the governing body for badminton in Kiribati. The Gilbertese team competed in the Pacific Games.

The Gilbertese team is part of the Badminton Oceania confederation.

Participation in Oceania Badminton Championships 

Mixed team

Participation in Pacific Games 

Mixed team

Current squad 
The following players were selected to represent Kiribati at the 2019 Pacific Games.

Male players
Timwata Kabaua
Tooma Teuaika

Female players
Tinabora Tekeiaki
Teitiria Utimawa

References 

Badminton
National badminton teams